Rud Ab District is a district (bakhsh) in Narmashir County, Kerman Province, Iran. At the 2006 census, its population was 28,370, in 6,902 families.  The district has one city: Nezamshahr. The district has two rural districts (dehestan): Rud Ab-e Gharbi Rural District and Rud Ab-e Sharqi Rural District.

References 

Narmashir County
Districts of Kerman Province